A Song for Tibet is a 1991 Canadian short documentary film about efforts of Tibetans in exile, led by the Dalai Lama, to free their homeland and preserve their heritage. Directed by Anne Henderson, and produced by Abbey Neidik, Ali Kazimi and Kent Martin, A Song for Tibet received the Award for Best Short Documentary at the 13th Genie Awards as well as the People's Choice Award for Best Documentary Film at the Hawaii International Film Festival.  The film was co-produced by Arcady Films, DLI Productions and the National Film Board of Canada. Ali Kazimi was director of photography.

The film focuses on two Tibetans in exile in Canada: Thubten Samdup, who escaped from Tibet after the 1959 uprising against the Chinese, who teaches traditional performing arts in Montreal and heads the Canada-Tibet Committee; and Dicki Chhoyang, born in a refugee camp in India, who knows Tibet only through stories recounted by her parents. The film follows Dicki and Samdup from Montreal to Dharamshala, India and also documents the Dalai Lama's first public appearance in Canada.

References

External links
 Watch A Song for Tibet at NFB.ca
 

Best Short Documentary Film Genie and Canadian Screen Award winners
Tibetan independence movement
Documentary films about Tibet
1991 films
1991 documentary films
Canadian short documentary films
National Film Board of Canada documentaries
Films shot in Montreal
Films shot in India
Dharamshala
Documentary films about refugees
14th Dalai Lama
Documentary films about indigenous rights
1990s English-language films
1990s Canadian films